This is a list of aces in World War II from Italy. A flying ace or air ace is a military aviator credited with shooting down five or more enemy aircraft during aerial combat. For other countries see List of World War II aces by country.

See also 
 Regia Aeronautica, the air force of the Kingdom of Italy
 Italian Co-Belligerent Air Force (Aeronautica Cobelligerante del Sud), the air force of the Royalist Badoglio-government in southern Italy during the last years of World War II
 Aeronautica Nazionale Repubblicana, the air force of the Italian Social Republic
 Esercito Nazionale Repubblicano, the army of the Italian Social Republic
 Marina Nazionale Repubblicana, the navy of the Italian Social Republic
 Aviazione Legionaria, an expeditionary corps from the Italian Royal Air Force (Regia Aeronautica Italiana), set up in 1936 and sent to provide support to the rebel faction in the Spanish Civil War.
in Italian , List of World War II aces from Italy in Italian language.

Notes 
Abbreviations
 "KIA" – Killed in action (dates are included where possible).
 "KIFA" – Killed in Flying Accident.
 "MIA" – Missing in action.
 "WIA" – Wounded in action.
 "DOW" – died of wounds received in action (WIA).
 "POW" – taken Prisoner of war.

Awards

References
Citations

Bibliography
 Beurling, George and Leslie Roberts. Malta Spitfire: The Story of a Fighter Pilot. New York/Toronto: Ferrar & Rinehart, Inc. 1943. NO ISBN.
 Gustavsson, Håkan and Ludovico Slongo. Fiat CR.42 Aces of World War 2. Midland House, West Way, Botley, Oxford /New York, Osprey Publishing, 2009. .
 Gustavsson Håkan.URL "Italy Capitano Mario Visintini Medaglia d'Oro al Valor Militare." Biplane fighter aces on Håkan's aviation page. Retrieved: November 12, 2009.
 Massimello, Giovanni and Giorgio Apostolo. Italian Aces of World War Two. Oxford: Osprey Publishing, 2000. .
 Shores, Christopher, Air Aces, Greenwich, CT, Bison Books, 1983. .
 Skulski, Przemysław: Fiat CR.42 Falco. Redbourn, UK: Mushroom Model Publications, 2007. .
 
 Spick, Mike: The complete fighter ace - All the World's Fighter Aces, 1914–2000. London, Greenhill Books, 1999. .
 Sutherland, Jon & Diane Canwell: Air War East Africa 1940-41 The RAF versus the Italian Air Force. Barnsley (South Yorkshire) Pen and Sword Aviation, 2009. .
  Il Portale delle Memorie del combattenti Decorati al Valor Militare della Provincia di Pesaro Urbino  (Memorial site for the soldiers of the Province of Pesaro and Urbino decorated for Military Valor)

Italian
World War II fighter aces